The 1997 Alabama Crimson Tide baseball team represented the University of Alabama in the 1997 NCAA Division I baseball season. The Crimson Tide played their home games at Sewell–Thomas Stadium, and were led by third-year head coach Jim Wells. They finished as the national runner-up after falling to LSU in the 1997 College World Series Final.

Roster

Schedule 

! style="" | Regular Season
|- valign="top" 

|- align="center" bgcolor="ccffcc"
| February 14 ||  || Sewell–Thomas Stadium || 8–2 || 1–0 || –
|- align="center" bgcolor="ccffcc"
| February 15 || Marshall || Sewell–Thomas Stadium || 17–4 || 2–0 || –
|- align="center" bgcolor="ccffcc"
| February 16 || Marshall || Sewell–Thomas Stadium || 16–0 || 3–0 || –
|- align="center" bgcolor="ccffcc"
| February 18 ||  || Sewell–Thomas Stadium || 9–3 || 4–0 || –
|- align="center" bgcolor="ccffcc"
| February 19 || Louisiana Tech || Sewell–Thomas Stadium || 13–7 || 5–0 || –
|- align="center" bgcolor="ccffcc"
| February 21 ||  || Sewell–Thomas Stadium || 21–3 || 6–0 || –
|- align="center" bgcolor="ccffcc"
| February 22 || Michigan || Sewell–Thomas Stadium || 19–3 || 7–0 || –
|- align="center" bgcolor="ccffcc"
| February 23 || Michigan || Sewell–Thomas Stadium || 22–7 || 8–0 || –
|- align="center" bgcolor="ccffcc"
| February 25 ||  || Sewell–Thomas Stadium || 15–5 || 9–0 || –
|- align="center" bgcolor="ccffcc"
| February 28 ||  || Sewell–Thomas Stadium || 9–2 || 10–0 || –
|-

|- align="center" bgcolor="ccffcc"
| March 1 || Illinois || Sewell–Thomas Stadium || 5–3 || 11–0 || –
|- align="center" bgcolor="ccffcc"
| March 2 || Illinois || Sewell–Thomas Stadium || 6–5 || 12–0 || –
|- align="center" bgcolor="ccffcc"
| March 4 ||  || Sewell–Thomas Stadium || 11–0 || 13–0 || –
|- align="center" bgcolor="ccffcc"
| March 7 ||  || Sewell–Thomas Stadium  || 15–6 || 14–0 || 1–0
|- align="center" bgcolor="ccffcc"
| March 8 || Georgia || Sewell–Thomas Stadium  || 10–6 || 15–0 || 2–0
|- align="center" bgcolor="ffcccc"
| March 9 || Georgia || Sewell–Thomas Stadium  || 6–11 || 15–1 || 2–1
|- align="center" bgcolor="ccffcc"
| March 11 ||  || Sewell–Thomas Stadium || 7–2 || 16–1 || 2–1
|- align="center" bgcolor="ccffcc"
| March 12 || Winthrop || Sewell–Thomas Stadium || 9–7 || 17–1 || 2–1
|- align="center" bgcolor="ccffcc"
| March 14 || at Florida || Alfred A. McKethan Stadium || 6–4 || 18–1 || 3–1
|- align="center" bgcolor="ccffcc"
| March 15 || at Florida || Alfred A. McKethan Stadium || 13–9 || 19–1 || 4–1
|- align="center" bgcolor="ffcccc"
| March 16 || at Florida || Alfred A. McKethan Stadium || 4–9 || 19–2 || 4–2
|- align="center" bgcolor="ccffcc"
| March 19 ||  || Sewell–Thomas Stadium || 11–2 || 20–2 || 4–2
|- align="center" bgcolor="ccffcc"
| March 21 || at  || Lindsey Nelson Stadium || 3–2 || 21–2 || 5–2
|- align="center" bgcolor="ffcccc"
| March 22 || at Tennessee || Lindsey Nelson Stadium || 7–8 || 21–3 || 5–3
|- align="center" bgcolor="ffcccc"
| March 23 || at Tennessee || Lindsey Nelson Stadium || 2–9 || 21–4 || 5–4
|- align="center" bgcolor="ccffcc"
| March 25 || at  || Pete Taylor Park || 19–14 || 22–4 || 5–4
|- align="center" bgcolor="ccffcc"
| March 28 ||  || Sewell–Thomas Stadium || 8–2 || 23–4 || 6–4
|- align="center" bgcolor="ccffcc"
| March 29 || Vanderbilt || Sewell–Thomas Stadium || 6–3 || 24–4 || 7–4
|- align="center" bgcolor="ccffcc"
| March 29 || Vanderbilt || Sewell–Thomas Stadium || 14–2 || 25–4 || 8–4
|-

|- align="center" bgcolor="ccffcc"
|April 1 ||  || Sewell–Thomas Stadium || 9–8 || 26–4 || 8–4
|- align="center" bgcolor="ccffcc"
|April 2 || at Middle Tennessee || Reese Smith Jr. Field || 3–2 || 27–4 || 8–4
|- align="center" bgcolor="ccffcc"
|April 4 ||  || Sewell–Thomas Stadium || 10–3 || 27–4 || 9–4
|- align="center" bgcolor="ffcccc"
|April 5  || Kentucky || Sewell–Thomas Stadium || 2–9 || 28–5 || 9–5
|- align="center" bgcolor="ccffcc"
|April 6  || Kentucky || Sewell–Thomas Stadium || 9–5 || 29–5 || 10–5
|- align="center" bgcolor="ccffcc"
|April 8 || Southern Mississippi || Sewell–Thomas Stadium || 14–6 || 30–5 || 10–5
|- align="center" bgcolor="ffcccc"
|April 9 || UAB || Sewell–Thomas Stadium || 2–10 || 30–6 || 10–5
|- align="center" bgcolor="ffcccc"
|April 12 || at  || Plainsman Park || 8–13 || 30–7 || 10–6
|- align="center" bgcolor="ccffcc"
|April 12 || at Auburn || Plainsman Park || 22–7 || 31–7 || 11–6
|- align="center" bgcolor="ccffcc"
|April 13 || at Auburn || Plainsman Park || 12–11 || 32–7 || 12–6
|- align="center" bgcolor="ffcccc"
|April 15 || at South Alabama || Eddie Stanky Field || 7–8 || 32–8 || 12–6
|- align="center" bgcolor="ccffcc"
|April 16 || at  || Joe Lee Griffin Stadium || 4–2 || 33–8 || 12–6
|- align="center" bgcolor="ffcccc"
|April 18 || at  || Dudy Noble Field || 10–11 || 33–9 || 12–7
|- align="center" bgcolor="ffcccc"
|April 19 || at Mississippi State || Dudy Noble Field || 7–9 || 33–10 || 12–8
|- align="center" bgcolor="ccffcc"
|April 20 || at Mississippi State || Dudy Noble Field || 6–3 || 34–10 || 13–8
|- align="center" bgcolor="ccffcc"
|April 23 ||  || Sewell–Thomas Stadium || 10–9 || 35–10 || 13–8
|- align="center" bgcolor="ccffcc"
|April 23 || West Alabama || Sewell–Thomas Stadium || 15–4 || 36–10 || 13–8
|- align="center" bgcolor="ccffcc"
|April 25 ||  || Sewell–Thomas Stadium || 11–10 || 37–10 || 14–8
|- align="center" bgcolor="ccffcc"
|April 26 || Arkansas || Sewell–Thomas Stadium || 13–2 || 38–10 || 15–8
|- align="center" bgcolor="ccffcc"
|April 29 || Samford || Sewell–Thomas Stadium || 4–3 || 39–10 || 15–8
|-

|- align="center" bgcolor="#ccffcc"
| May 3 || at  || Swayze Field || 8–2 || 40–10 || 16–8
|- align="center" bgcolor="#ccffcc"
| May 3 || at Ole Miss || Swayze Field || 14–7 || 41–10 || 17–8
|- align="center" bgcolor="#ccffcc"
| May 4 || at Ole Miss || Swayze Field || 9–5 || 42–10 || 18–8
|- align="center" bgcolor="#ccffcc"
| May 9 || LSU || Sewell–Thomas Stadium || 6–4 || 43–10 || 19–8
|- align="center" bgcolor="#ccffcc"
| May 10 || LSU || Sewell–Thomas Stadium || 28–2 || 44–10 || 20–8
|- align="center" bgcolor="#ffcccc"
| May 10 || LSU || Sewell–Thomas Stadium || 4–6 || 44–11 || 20–9
|-

|-
! style="" | Postseason
|- valign="top"

|- align="center" bgcolor="#ccffcc"
| May 15 || vs Mississippi State || Golden Park || 16–3 || 45–11 || 20–9
|- align="center" bgcolor="#ccffcc"
| May 16 || vs Florida || Golden Park || 13–6 || 46–11 || 20–9
|- align="center" bgcolor="#ffcccc"
| May 17 || vs LSU || Golden Park || 7–12 || 46–12 || 20–9
|- align="center" bgcolor="#ccffcc"
| May 17 || vs Florida || Golden Park || 6–3 || 47–12 || 20–9
|- align="center" bgcolor="#ccffcc"
| May 18 || vs LSU || Golden Park || 12–2 || 48–12 || 20–9
|-

|- align="center" bgcolor="#ccffcc"
| May 22 ||  || Sewell–Thomas Stadium || 8–5 || 49–12 || 20–9
|- align="center" bgcolor="#ccffcc"
| May 23 ||  || Sewell–Thomas Stadium || 6–2 || 50–12 || 20–9
|- align="center" bgcolor="#ccffcc"
| May 24 ||  || Sewell–Thomas Stadium || 6–3 || 51–12 || 20–9
|- align="center" bgcolor="#ccffcc"
| May 25 ||  || Sewell–Thomas Stadium || 9–8 || 52–12 || 20–9
|-

|- align="center" bgcolor="#ccffcc"
| March 31 || vs Mississippi State || Johnny Rosenblatt Stadium || 3–2 || 53–12 || 20–9
|- align="center" bgcolor="#ffcccc"
| June 2 || vs Miami (FL) || Johnny Rosenblatt Stadium || 1–6 || 53–13 || 20–9
|- align="center" bgcolor="#ccffcc"
| June 3 || vs Mississippi State || Johnny Rosenblatt Stadium || 9–5 || 54–13 || 20–9
|- align="center" bgcolor="#ccffcc"
| June 5 || vs Miami (FL) || Johnny Rosenblatt Stadium || 8–6 || 55–13 || 20–9
|- align="center" bgcolor="#ccffcc"
| June 6 || vs Miami (FL) || Johnny Rosenblatt Stadium || 8–2 || 56–13 || 20–9
|- align="center" bgcolor="#ffcccc"
| June 7 || vs LSU || Johnny Rosenblatt Stadium || 6–13 || 56–14 || 20–9
|-

Awards and honors 
Dave Magadan
 College World Series All-Tournament Team
 Golden Spikes Award

Tim Meacham
 College World Series All-Tournament Team

Crimson Tide in the 1997 MLB Draft 
The following members of the Alabama Crimson Tide baseball program were drafted in the 1997 Major League Baseball Draft.

References 

Alabama
Alabama Crimson Tide baseball seasons
Alabama Crimson Tide baseball
College World Series seasons
Alabama